Royal Parade may refer to:

 Royal Parade – street in Melbourne
 Variant of the Virginia Reel (solitaire) card game